Hamarmeşə is a village and municipality in the Lerik Rayon of Azerbaijan. It has a population of 673.   The municipality consists of the villages of Hamarmeşə, Şifəkəran, and Haran.

References

Populated places in Lerik District